Gat is a kibbutz in southern Israel. Located near Kiryat Gat, it falls under the jurisdiction of Yoav Regional Council.

History
Kibbutz Gat was founded in 1934 by Jewish immigrants from Poland, Yugoslavia and Austria. In 1949, after the inhabitants of the nearby  Palestinian village of Iraq al-Manshiyya had been expelled, some of their lands were transferred to Kibbutz Gat. Primor, one of Israel's largest juice manufacturers, is operated by the kibbutz. Citramed, another company located in Kibbutz Gat, has developed a method to squeeze out the antibacterial properties in the rind of citrus fruit for use as a natural preservative in health products and the food industry.

The name is derived from the Philistine town Gath, which at the time the kibbutz was founded was identified with the nearby site of Tel Erani. The town of Kiryat Gat (lit. Gath City) was named for the same reason. However, most scholars now consider Tell es-Safi, thirteen kilometres to the northeast, a more likely candidate.

Notable people
Yossi Dina

References

External links
Official website 

Kibbutzim
Kibbutz Movement
Populated places established in 1934
Populated places in Southern District (Israel)
1934 establishments in Mandatory Palestine
Austrian-Jewish culture in Israel
Polish-Jewish culture in Israel
Yugoslav-Jewish culture in Israel